Glenwood is a suburb on the lower Berea in Durban, KwaZulu-Natal, South Africa.

Schools in the area include Glenwood High School, Glenwood Preparatory School (formerly Parkview Primary School), Glenwood Junior Primary School, Open Air School, Penzance Primary School, St. Henry's Marist Brothers' College and Durban Girls' High School.

Political History

The current Ward Councillor for Glenwood under Ward 33 in the Ethekwini Municipality is the DA’s Sakhile Mngadi (28) who is the youngest Ward Councillor in the city as elected in the November 2021 Local Government Elections.

References

Suburbs of Durban